Józef Oźmin (19 April 1903 – 25 June 1999) was a Polish painter. His work was part of the painting event in the art competition at the 1936 Summer Olympics.

References

1903 births
1999 deaths
20th-century Polish painters
20th-century Polish male artists
Olympic competitors in art competitions
People from Kalisz
Polish male painters